Magnolia gloriensis is a species of plant in the family Magnoliaceae. It is native to the mountains of Costa Rica and western Panama.

Description
Magnolia gloriensis is a large tree.

Range and habitat
Magnolia gloriensis is native to the mountains of Costa Rica and western Panama. It may also range into the mountains of southern Nicaragua, but its presence and range there is not known.

Magnolia gloriensis lives in humid submontane and lower montane forests, from 600 to 1,800 meters elevation. In the Monteverde region of northwestern Costa Rica it is found at 600 meters elevation. In western Panama it has been recorded between 1,500 and 1,800 meters elevation.

Conservation and threats
The species' population and conservation is not well understood. Portions of its range are in protected areas. Its conservation status is assessed as data deficient.

References

gloriensis
Trees of Costa Rica
Trees of Panama
Flora of the Talamancan montane forests
Plants described in 1996